is a Japanese actor, voice actor and singer. He previously worked for Aoni Production. He is also the host of the radio show Bleach B-Station. He played Ichigo Kurosaki in Bleach, Maeda Keiji in Sengoku Basara, Marco the Phoenix in One Piece series, Tidus in Final Fantasy X, Whis in Dragon Ball Super, Auel Neider in Mobile Suit Gundam Seed Destiny, Pegasus Seiya in Saint Seiya – Hades Chapter, Pod in Pokémon, Tenjuro Banno in Kamen Rider Drive and Li Xin in Kingdom. He won the "Best Rookie Actor" at the first Seiyu Awards. He is also the official Japanese dubbing voice of Zac Efron.

Career
Morita attended Kyoka Junior and Senior High School. When he was in high school, he joined the brass band club and was in charge of conducting the marching band, which led him to discover the joy of entertainment. He worked as an actor at NHK Promotion, studied under film director Yukio Fukamachi, and appeared in films, stage plays, and dramas. His motion capture for the role of Zell Dincht in the 1999 PlayStation game Final Fantasy VIII was his debut as an actor.

In 2001, he voiced and motion captured for the main character, Tidus, in the PS2 game Final Fantasy X, and since then he has mainly been active as a voice actor. While originally only in charge of motion capturing for Tidus, after more than 100 people auditioned and no voice actor was chosen, Morita was finally called in for an audition and was hired. When he was chosen to play the role, he thought he could handle it because he only had to do a voice, but in reality, he was shocked when he heard his own voice on the recording and his motionless performance. When he met Hideo Ishikawa, Kazuya Nakai, and Hiroshi Kamiya, his co-stars in the game, he came to respect the fun of voice acting and their attitude toward their work, and decided that he wanted to work in the same industry as them and join the same agency. On September 1, 2003, after working as a freelancer, he moved to Aoni Production, his first voice acting agency.

In October 2004, Morita portrayed the main character Ichigo Kurosaki in the TV anime Bleach. Morita said that Ichigo was one of his favorite characters he ever played alongside Tidus, and in 2005 he was chosen to replace Tōru Furuya as the voice of the main character Pegasus Seiya in Saint Seiya: Hades. Morita was said to have shed tears of joy when he was chosen at the audition. He also voiced Ryūji Takane, the main character in Ring ni Kakero 1, and was thus selected twice to play the lead in works written by Masami Kurumada.

In 2007, he won the Best Rookie Actor award at the 1st Seiyu Awards. In 2008, he returned to the stage as a guest performer in a performance by the K-Show theater company organized by Kentarō Itō, and in October 2009, he played his first leading role and first performance as a chairman.

In 2012, Morita made his debut as a singer with RING BONES. In 2013, he confessed on his Twitter page that he was in a critical situation at one point, wavering between life and death due to anaphylactic shock. He said he had "almost died three times" due to anaphylactic shock, myocardial infarction and side effects. He was in a very dangerous state, but thanks to the efforts of doctors, he recovered.

On December 31, 2020, he announced on Twitter that he would be leaving Aoni Production, the company to which he had belonged for 17 years, and would be working as a freelancer from January 1, 2021.

Filmography

Television animation
The Prince of Tennis (2001–2005), Tashiro
Sonic X (2003), Chris Thorndyke (Adult)
Interlude (2003), Unnamed protagonist
Di Gi Charat Nyo (2003), Omocha Yasushi
One Piece (2003, 2009–2010, 2019), Marco
Aqua Kids (2004), Juno
Diamond Daydreams (2004), Yuu
BECK (2004–2005), Masaru Hyōdō
Kidou Senshi Gundam SEED Destiny (2004–2005), Auel Neider
Onmyō Taisenki (2004–2005), Yakumo Yoshikawa
Ring ni Kakero (2004–2011), Ryuji Takane
Bleach (2004–2012, 2022), Ichigo Kurosaki, Hollow Ichigo
Major (2004), Toshiya Sato
Detective Conan (2005, 2007, 2020), Ryosuke Fukuma (Ep. 419–420), Naosuke Kurosawa (Ep. 478), Fusaya Oide (Ep. 990-991)
Kiniro no Corda (2006), Hihara Kazuki
Marginal Prince (2006), Alfred Visconti
Baccano! (2007), Claire Stanfield
Sengoku Basara: Samurai Kings (2009), Maeda Keiji
Eden of the East (2009), Ryō Yūki
Bakuman (2010–2011), Kazuya Hiramaru
Sengoku Basara: Samurai Kings 2 (2010), Maeda Keiji
SD Gundam Sangokuden Brave Battle Warriors (2010–2011), Ryomou Dijeh
Pocket Monsters: Best Wishes! (2010–2011), Chili
Tiger & Bunny (2011–2022), Barnaby Brooks Jr.
Bakuman 2 (2011–2012), Kazuya Hiramaru
Saint Seiya Omega (2012), Sagittarius Seiya (Ep. 90)
Bakuman 3 (2012–2013), Kazuya Hiramaru
Kingdom (2012–2022), Shin
Hakkenden: Eight Dogs of the East (2013), Hazuki 
Ace of Diamond (2013–2015), Koichiro Tanba
Yona of the Dawn (2014), Kija
Sengoku Basara: End of Judgement (2014), Maeda Keiji
World Trigger (2014), Shūji Miwa
Rage of Bahamut: Genesis (2014), Azazel
Kiniro no Corda Blue Sky (2014), Shiro Hozumi, Kazuki Hihara
Death Parade (2015), Yōsuke Tateishi
The Heroic Legend of Arslan (2015), Xandes
Kuroko's Basketball Season 3 (2015), Shōgo Haizaki
Baby Steps Season 2  (2015), Sakuya Takagi
Dragon Ball Super (2015), Whis, Copy Vegeta, Iru 
Fafner in the Azure: Exodus (2015), Billy Morgan
K: Return of Kings (2015), Yukari Mishakuji
Big Order (2016), Eiji Hoshimiya
Rewrite (2016–2017), Kotarō Tennōji
Tiger Mask W (2016), Kazuchika Okada
Rage of Bahamut: Virgin Soul (2017), Azazel
Major 2nd (2018), Toshiya Satō
Black Clover (2019), Raia (Ep. 87)
Knights of the Zodiac: Saint Seiya (2019), Pegasus Seiya
Shaman King (2021), Mosuke
Kaginado (2021), Kotarō Tennōji
Love of Kill (2022), Nikka

Original video animation (OVA)
Saint Seiya: Hades Chapter (2002–2008;OVA), Pegasus Seiya
Bludgeoning Angel Dokuro-Chan (2005), Yamazaki
Dragon Ball: Yo! Son Goku and His Friends Return!! (2008), Tarble
Kite Liberator (2008), Rin Gaga
Bungo Stray Dogs: Walk Alone (2017), Shōsaku Katsura

Film
Bleach: Memories of Nobody (2006), Ichigo Kurosaki
Bleach: The DiamondDust Rebellion (2007), Ichigo Kurosaki
Bleach: Fade to Black (2008), Ichigo Kurosaki
Eden of the East: The King of Eden (2009), Ryō Yūki
Eden of the East: Paradise Lost (2010), Ryō Yūki
Bleach: Hell Verse (2010), Ichigo Kurosaki
Sengoku Basara: The Last Party (2011), Maeda Keiji
Tiger & Bunny: The Beginning (2012), Barnaby Brooks Jr.
Combustible (2013), Matsukichi
Dragon Ball Z: Battle of Gods (2013), Whis
K: Missing Kings (2014), Yukari Mishakuji
Tiger & Bunny: The Rising (2014), Barnaby Brooks Jr.
Dragon Ball Z: Resurrection 'F' (2015), Whis
Dragon Ball Super: Broly (2018), Whis
Dragon Ball Super: Super Hero (2022), Whis
Gekijōban Collar × Malice Deep Cover (2023), Aiji Yanagi

Live action
Zyuden Sentai Kyoryuger (Debo Tanabanta) (Ep. 20)
Kamen Rider Drive Dr.Tenjuro Banno/Banno Driver/Gold Drive (Ep. 33 – 46), Sigma Circular (Male Voice) (Ep. 46 – 47) (Female Voice of Ayumi Fujimura)

Video games
Final Fantasy X (2001; video game), Tidus
Kingdom Hearts (2002; video game), Tidus
Final Fantasy X-2 (2003; video game), Tidus, Shuyin
Sengoku Basara (2005), Maeda Keiji
Riviera: The Promised Land (2005; video game), Ledah
Bleach: Heat the Soul (series) (2005–2010; video game series), Ichigo Kurosaki
Sengoku Basara 2 (2006; video game), Maeda Keiji
Dissidia Final Fantasy (2008, video game), Tidus
Dissidia 012 Final Fantasy (2011, video game), Tidus
One Piece: Pirate Warriors 2 (2013, video game), Marco
Final Fantasy Explorers (2014, video game), Tidus
Granblue Fantasy (2014, video game), Meteon, Azazel
Dissidia Final Fantasy NT (2015, video game), Tidus
Collar × Malice (2016; visual novel video game), Aiji Yanagi
World of Final Fantasy (2016; video game), Tidus
Jump Force (2019; video game), Ichigo Kurosaki, Pegasus Seiya
Arena of Valor (2018; video game), Arthur (Japanese Voice), (2021; Collab AOV x Bleach Event), Ichigo Kurosaki (skin)
Genshin Impact (2021; video game), Thoma

Unknown date

Bleach series (Ichigo Kurosaki)
Bakumetsu Renka Shinsengumi (Kondo Hasami)
Datenshi no Amai Yuuwaku x Kaikan Phrase (Yoshihiko "Santa" Nagai)
Dragon Ball Heroes (Avatar: Saiyan (male), Berserker-type; Whis)
Dragon Ball: Raging Blast 2 (Tarble)
Dragon Ball Z: Ultimate Tenkaichi as Hero Modes 'Evil Voice'
Dynasty Warriors 5 (Pang De)
Final Fantasy VIII (Zell) as the Motion Capture
J-Stars Victory Vs (Ichigo Kurosaki, Pegasus Seiya)
Kiniro no Corda series (Hihara Kazuki)
Puyo Puyo! 15th Anniversary (Schezo Wegey)
Puyo Puyo 7 (Schezo Wegey)
Puyo Puyo!! 20th Anniversary (Schezo Wegey)
Puyo Puyo Tetris (Schezo Wegey)
Rewrite (Kotarou Tennouji)
Riveria: The Promised Land (Ledah)
Saint Seiya: Brave Soldiers (Pegasus Seiya)
Saint Seiya Senki (Pegasus Seiya)
Sengoku Basara 2 (Maeda Keiji)
Shiratsuyu no Kai (Nakamachi Shin)
Signal (Yamato "None" Hoshoin)
Summon Night: Swordcraft Story 2 (Loki)
Sweet Fuse: At your side (Meoshi Kouta)
The Legend of Heroes: Akatsuki no Kiseki (Lechter Arundel)
The Legend of Heroes: Trails from Zero (Lechter Arundel)
The Legend of Heroes: Trails in the Sky the 3rd (Lechter Arundel)
The Legend of Heroes: Trails of Cold Steel (Lechter Arundel)
The Legend of Heroes: Trails of Cold Steel II (Lechter Arundel)
The Legend of Heroes: Trails of Cold Steel III (Lechter Arundel)
The Legend of Heroes: Trails of Cold Steel IV (Lechter Arundel)
Tokimeki Memorial Girl's Side: 2nd Kiss (Saeki Teru)
Transformers Armada The Game (Hot Shot)
Yo-Jin-Bo: The Bodyguards (Yozaburo Shiraanui)

Drama CD
Lupin III (2012) (Arsene Lupin)
Special A (Tadashi Karino)
Superior (Lakshri)
 Di[e]ce (Naoto Kanzaki)

Dubbing
Zac Efron
The Derby Stallion (Patrick McCardle)
High School Musical (Troy Bolton)
High School Musical 2 (Troy Bolton)
High School Musical 3: Senior Year (Troy Bolton)
17 Again (Mike O'Donnell (teenage))
Charlie St. Cloud (Charlie St. Cloud)
The Paperboy (Jack Jansen)
That Awkward Moment (Jason)
Neighbors (Teddy Sanders)
We Are Your Friends (Cole Carter)
Neighbors 2: Sorority Rising (Teddy Sanders)
Dirty Grandpa (Jason Kelly)
Baywatch (Matt Brody)
Extremely Wicked, Shockingly Evil and Vile (Ted Bundy)
Firestarter (Andy McGee)
The Edge of Seventeen (Nick Mossman (Alexander Calvert))
El Camino Christmas (Eric Roth (Luke Grimes))
The Green Hornet (Kato (Jay Chou))
In Time (Timekeeper Jaeger (Collins Pennie))
Mindhunter (Holden Ford (Jonathan Groff))
Now You See Me 2 (Li (Jay Chou))
Outlander (King Louis XV of France (Lionel Lingelser))
Prometheus (Chance (Emun Elliott))
The Time Traveler's Wife (Henry DeTamble (Theo James))

Discography

Albums

References

External links
 
 
 
 
 
 

1972 births
Living people
Japanese male pop singers
Japanese male stage actors
Japanese male video game actors
Japanese male voice actors
Male voice actors from Tokyo
People from Sumida
Singers from Tokyo
Sony Music Entertainment Japan artists
20th-century Japanese male actors
21st-century Japanese male actors
21st-century Japanese singers
21st-century Japanese male singers